Mateusz Kus (born 14 July 1987) is a Polish handball player who plays for Energa MKS Kalisz and the Polish national team.

He participated at the 2016 Summer Olympics in Rio de Janeiro, in the men's handball tournament.

References

1987 births
Living people
Polish male handball players
Vive Kielce players
HC Motor Zaporizhia players
Olympic handball players of Poland
Handball players at the 2016 Summer Olympics
People from Piekary Śląskie